This is a list of all tornadoes that were confirmed by local offices of the National Weather Service in the United States from September to December 2016.

United States yearly total

September

September 1 event

September 2 event

September 3 event

September 4 event

September 6 event

September 7 event

September 9 event

September 13 event

September 14 event

September 15 event

September 16 event

September 17 event

September 21 event

September 22 event

October

October 4 event

October 6 event

October 8 event
These tornadoes were associated with the rainbands of Hurricane Matthew as it neared South Carolina.

October 12 event

October 14 event

October 22 event

November

November 18 event

November 22 event

November 27 event

November 28 event

November 29 event

November 30 event

December

December 5 event

December 13 event

December 17 event

December 18 event

December 25 event

December 26 event

December 29 event

See also

 Tornadoes of 2016
 List of United States tornadoes from June to August 2016

Notes

References

Tornadoes of 2016
2016 natural disasters in the United States
2016, 09
September 2016 events in the United States
October 2016 events in the United States
November 2016 events in the United States
December 2016 events in the United States